Seán Moran (born 16 December 1992) is an Irish hurler who plays for Dublin Senior Championship club Cuala and at inter-county level with the Dublin senior hurling team. He usually lines out as a centre-back.

Honours

Cuala
All-Ireland Senior Club Hurling Championship (2): 2017, 2018
Leinster Senior Club Hurling Championship (2): 2016, 2017
Dublin Senior Hurling Championship (3): 2015, 2016, 2017

References

External links
Seán Moran profile at the Dublin GAA website

1992 births
Living people
Cuala hurlers
Dublin inter-county hurlers